HaKochav Lod was an Israeli football club based in Lod. The club, based in the Turkish Jews community in Lod, existed for two seasons before folding, its players joining Hapoel Lod. In its two years of existence, HaKochav finished 12th (out of 14) and 7th (out of 8) in the Central division of Liga Gimel.

References

Lod
Association football clubs established in 1954
Association football clubs disestablished in 1956
1954 establishments in Israel
1956 disestablishments in Israel
Sport in Lod